We Dare is an adult-oriented party video game developed by Ubisoft Milan, for the Wii and PlayStation 3 (PS3) gaming systems. It is marketed as a "sexy, quirky, party game" and involves kissing, striptease and spanking. However, reviewers in countries where the game is available have noted that the game is in fact a relatively tame party game compilation with only very mild sexual connotations.

Release
The Pan European Game Information (PEGI) and Australian Classification Board (ACB) have drawn criticism by implying that the game is suitable for children (despite being marketed to adults): As the boards can only classify the game content, not what the players may be doing,  PEGI rated the game a 12, while the ACB gave it an even more lenient PG rating. Months later, the PG rating given in Australia was reviewed, but retained.

The game's YouTube trailer has since been blocked from viewing by Ubisoft, and US release plans were shelved. This was followed by a cancellation of the UK release, citing "[negative] public reaction". The game was later released in the UK.

The game was released in Europe on March 14, 2011, and in Australia on April 14, 2011.

Music
This game includes some dancing mini-games with several songs to choose from. All the songs are cover versions. The cover versions were created by "Creative Sphere". The track list includes:
Grace Kelly – MIKA
Think – The Blues Brothers feat. Aretha Franklin 
Sex Bomb – Tom Jones & Mousse T.
(I've Had) The Time of My Life – Bill Medley & Jennifer Warnes
Lady Marmalade – Christina Aguilera, Lil' Kim, Mýa, Pink, & Missy Elliott
Material Girl – Madonna
Smoke Gets in Your Eyes – The Platters
I'm Too Sexy – Right Said Fred
Super Freak – Rick James
Time Warp – Richard O'Brien, Patricia Quinn, Nell Campbell, & Charles Gray
Y.M.C.A. – The Village People
You Sexy Thing – Hot Chocolate

Reception
EuroGamer reviewed the game 3/10 citing it as a "poor quality collection of low-rent mini-games, most of which are badly executed rip-offs of ancient ideas".

References

External links
We Dare at Ubisoft
Official trailer on IGN's YouTube channel

2011 video games
Erotic video games
Party video games
PlayStation 3 games
PlayStation Move-compatible games
Ubisoft games
Video games developed in Italy
Wii games